In the mathematical fields of geometry and topology, a coarse structure on a set X is a collection of subsets of the cartesian product X × X with certain properties which allow the large-scale structure of metric spaces and topological spaces to be defined.

The concern of traditional geometry and topology is with the small-scale structure of the space: properties such as the continuity of a function depend on whether the inverse images of small open sets, or neighborhoods, are themselves open. Large-scale properties of a space—such as boundedness, or the degrees of freedom of the space—do not depend on such features. Coarse geometry and coarse topology provide tools for measuring the large-scale properties of a space, and just as a metric or a topology contains information on the small-scale structure of a space, a coarse structure contains information on its large-scale properties.

Properly, a coarse structure is not the large-scale analog of a topological structure, but of a uniform structure.

Definition

Explicitly:

 Identity/diagonal: 
 The diagonal  is a member of —the identity relation.
 Closed under taking subsets: 
 If  and  then 
 Closed under taking inverses: 
 If  then the inverse (or transpose)  is a member of —the inverse relation.
 Closed under taking unions: 
 If  then their union  is a member of
 Closed under composition: 
 If  then their product  is a member of —the composition of relations.

Intuition

The controlled sets are "small" sets, or "negligible sets": a set  such that  is controlled is negligible, while a function  such that its graph is controlled is "close" to the identity. In the bounded coarse structure, these sets are the bounded sets, and the functions are the ones that are a finite distance from the identity in the uniform metric.

Coarse maps

Examples

 The  on a metric space  is the collection  of all subsets  of  such that  is finite. With this structure, the integer lattice  is coarsely equivalent to -dimensional Euclidean space.
Such a space is coarsely equivalent to a point. A metric space with the bounded coarse structure is bounded (as a coarse space) if and only if it is bounded (as a metric space).
 The trivial coarse structure only consists of the diagonal and its subsets. In this structure, a map is a coarse equivalence if and only if it is a bijection (of sets).
 The  on a metric space  is the collection of all subsets  of  such that for all  there is a compact set  of  such that  for all  Alternatively, the collection of all subsets  of  such that  is compact.

See also

References

 John Roe, Lectures in Coarse Geometry, University Lecture Series Vol. 31, American Mathematical Society: Providence, Rhode Island, 2003. Corrections to Lectures in Coarse Geometry
 

General topology
Metric geometry
Topology